2nd National Assembly may refer to:

 2nd National Assembly at Astros
 2nd National Assembly of France
 2nd National Assembly of Laos, following the 1st Supreme People's Assembly of Laos
 2nd National Assembly of Namibia
 2nd National Assembly of Pakistan
 2nd National Assembly of the Philippines
 2nd National Assembly of Serbia
 2nd National Assembly of South Korea